A water stop  is a break and a place to break for drinking water in sports events (sports competitions or training) for some types of sports, such as various long distance types of running (e.g., marathon), cycling, etc. Similarly, a water break is a break to drink water in some sports events held in one place. 

Water stops and breaks have become obligatory relatively recently. Before the 1950s, there had been a practice to eliminate water breaks in order "to toughen up boys" (see "Junction Boys" for an example).

Water stops are used to combat  interrelated dangers: hyperthermia, dehydration and hyponatremia (low blood level of sodium). Drinking water combats dehydration, while intake of electrolyte solutions (often provided by various sports drinks) combats hyponatremia and its severe form, water intoxication.

Water stops during a marathon are generally spaced between 2 miles and 5 kilometers (3.1 miles) apart, resulting in 8-12 stops. Stopping for 10 seconds per station results in 1-2 minutes of added time, but the loss of stamina due to dehydration would add much more.

Compared to dehydration, hyponatremia is a relatively recently recognized danger, and there are different opinions about how much water to drink at each water stop. Some texts say that thirst is not a reliable indicator of the need in water, while other say that obligatory drinking at every opportunity without real need increases the danger of hyponatremia. "If you hear sloshing in your stomach... you can by-pass that water stop". (Jeff Galloway)

In Sumo, if a bout goes for many minutes the referee may call a break traditionally called mizu-iri or "water break".

Temporary introduction of water breaks during COVID pandemic
Many team sports, such as association football, gaelic sports and rugby union, introduced water breaks into games as part of measures to tackle the spread of COVID-19. Allowing players to drink from their own bottle at regular intervals during games, as opposed to the nearest bottle during incidental stoppages, prevented the spread of the virus.

References

Sports science
Water